Kantibhai Kalabhai Kharadi (born 1 June 1969) is an Indian politician.  Since 2012 he has been a member of the Gujarat Legislative Assembly from the Danta Assembly constituency. He is associated with the Indian National Congress.

References 

1969 births
Living people
Indian National Congress politicians from Gujarat
Gujarat MLAs 2012–2017
Gujarat MLAs 2017–2022
Gujarat MLAs 2022–2027